Hechi is a prefecture-level city in the northwest of the Guangxi Zhuang Autonomous Region, People's Republic of China, bordering Guizhou to the north. In June 2002 it gained city status.

Geography and climate

Hechi is located in northwestern Guangxi on the southern end of the Yunnan-Guizhou Plateau. It is very mountainous with ranges including in the north the Jiuwanda Mountains, in the northwest the Phoenix Mountains, in the east the Fengling Mountains, in the west, the Duyang Mountains, and in the southwest the Green Dragon Mountains. Bordering prefecture-level divisions are Liuzhou to the east, Laibin to the southeast, Nanning to the south, and Baise to the southwest in Guangxi and Qiannan Buyi and Miao Autonomous Prefecture, Guizhou to the north.

Hechi has a monsoon-influenced humid subtropical climate (Köppen Cwa) and is generally overcast. The short and mild winters begin dry but become progressively rainier and cloudier. Early spring is the cloudiest time of year, though the monsoonal rains do not arrive until May. Summer is long, hot, and humid, and is the sunniest season. Autumn is warmer and drier than spring. With monthly percent possible sunshine ranging from 15% in February and March to 43% in August, the city receives 1,259 hours of bright sunshine annually.

Administration

Hechi has 2 urban district, 4 counties, and 5 autonomous counties.

District:
 Jinchengjiang District
 Yizhou District

Counties:
 Nandan County
 Tian'e County
 Fengshan County
 Donglan County

Autonomous counties:
 Bama Yao Autonomous County
 Du'an Yao Autonomous County
 Dahua Yao Autonomous County
 Luocheng Mulao Autonomous County
 Huanjiang Maonan Autonomous County

Demographics
In 2010 Hechi's population was 3,991,900. 83.89%(2,826,400) of the people belong to the national minority. Ethnic groups include Zhuang, Han, Yao, Mulao, Maonan, Miao, Dong, and Shui. In these ethnic groups, Zhuang population was 2,542,852(63.7%), Yao was 365,910(9.16%).It is home to Guangxi's largest national minority population.

 These figures are based on the following official statistics:

Economy

Minerals
Hechi is one of Guangxi's most important mineral producers. All of Hechi's counties have large quantities of high quality mineral resources. They include but are not limited to tin, antimony, gold, zinc, indium, copper, iron, silver, manganese, and arsenic. It is a major source of gold for both China and the global market. Limestone and marble are also produced.

Water
Due to Hechi's tropical wet climate, water power is also a major resource. Hydropwer facilities on these rivers produce more than 10 gigawatts of electricity; half of Guangxi's hydropower energy.

Agriculture
Hechi's climate, weather, and soil make it a major agricultural center. More than 400 types of crops including oranges, pineapple, corn, lotus root, casava, sugarcane, tobacco, vegetables, melons, mulberry, mushrooms and more than 100 different kinds of rice are grown here. Oil plants such as peanuts, sesame, and grape are also important.

Fruit make up a significant portion of Hechi's agriculture.

Forestry
Forest products are another important industry. More than 200 species of wild plants can be used in Chinese medicine.

Flora and fauna
Due to its tropical wet climate, Hechi has an amazing level of biodiversity. There are more than 1800 species of plants, 150 species of trees, 700 species of insects, 50 species of fish, and 60 species of land animals, many of which are rare and protected. Animals such as langurs, pangolins, and wild cats can be found in Hechi's forested mountains.

Transportation

Air 
 Hechi Jinchengjiang Airport

Rail 
 Hechi Railway Station, part of the Guizhou–Guangxi Railway

References

External links
Official Website

 
Cities in Guangxi
Prefecture-level divisions of Guangxi